Hypoestes is a flowering plant genus of about 150 species. They are widely distributed throughout the tropical and subtropical lands around the Indian Ocean, and some adjacent regions.

It belongs to the subfamily Acanthoideae of the acanthus family, Acanthaceae. Therein, it is classified in the subtribe Justiciinae of tribe Ruellieae, making it a relative of such American genera as the mosaic plants (Fittonia), water-willows (Justicia) and wrightworts (Carlowrightia).

Hypoestes comes from the Greek 'hypo' meaning under, and 'estia' meaning house. It refers to the way the flowers are hidden by the fused bracts.

Many of these herbaceous to small shrubby plants of the undergrowth have boldly patterned leaves, typically featuring red colors. Some are grown as ornamental plants or pot plants. Most well-known among these are H. phyllostachya of Madagascar and its cultivars, commonly called polka dot plant.

Species
Hypoestes species accepted by the Plants of the World Online as of June 2021:

Hypoestes acuminata 
Hypoestes aldabrensis 
Hypoestes andamanensis 
Hypoestes angusta 
Hypoestes angustilabiata 
Hypoestes anisophylla 
Hypoestes arachnopus 
Hypoestes aristata 
Hypoestes bakeri 
Hypoestes betsiliensis 
Hypoestes bojeriana 
Hypoestes bosseri 
Hypoestes brachiata 
Hypoestes calycina 
Hypoestes cancellata 
Hypoestes canescens 
Hypoestes capitata 
Hypoestes carnosula 
Hypoestes catatii 
Hypoestes caudata 
Hypoestes celebica 
Hypoestes cernua 
Hypoestes chloroclada 
Hypoestes chlorotricha 
Hypoestes cinerascens 
Hypoestes cochlearia 
Hypoestes comorensis 
Hypoestes comosa 
Hypoestes complanata 
Hypoestes confertiflora 
Hypoestes congestiflora 
Hypoestes corymbosa 
Hypoestes cruenta 
Hypoestes cumingiana 
Hypoestes decaisneana 
Hypoestes decaryana 
Hypoestes diclipteroides 
Hypoestes discreta 
Hypoestes ecbolioides 
Hypoestes egena 
Hypoestes elegans 
Hypoestes elliotii 
Hypoestes erythrostachya 
Hypoestes fascicularis 
Hypoestes fastuosa 
Hypoestes flavescens 
Hypoestes flavovirens 
Hypoestes flexibilis 
Hypoestes floribunda 
Hypoestes forskaolii 
Hypoestes glandulifera 
Hypoestes gracilis 
Hypoestes halconensis 
Hypoestes hastata 
Hypoestes hirsuta 
Hypoestes humbertii 
Hypoestes humifusa 
Hypoestes incompta 
Hypoestes inconspicua 
Hypoestes involucrata 
Hypoestes isalensis 
Hypoestes jasminoides 
Hypoestes juanensis 
Hypoestes kjellbergii 
Hypoestes kuntzei 
Hypoestes laeta 
Hypoestes lanata 
Hypoestes larsenii 
Hypoestes lasioclada 
Hypoestes lasiostegia 
Hypoestes leptostegia 
Hypoestes longilabiata 
Hypoestes longispica 
Hypoestes longituba 
Hypoestes loniceroides 
Hypoestes macilenta 
Hypoestes maculosa 
Hypoestes malaccensis 
Hypoestes mangokiensis 
Hypoestes merrillii 
Hypoestes mindorensis 
Hypoestes mollior 
Hypoestes mollissima 
Hypoestes multispicata 
Hypoestes nummulariifolia 
Hypoestes obtusifolia 
Hypoestes oppositiflora 
Hypoestes oxystegia 
Hypoestes palawanensis 
Hypoestes parvula 
Hypoestes perrieri 
Hypoestes phyllostachya 
Hypoestes poilanei 
Hypoestes poissonii 
Hypoestes polythyrsa 
Hypoestes populifolia 
Hypoestes potamophila 
Hypoestes psilochlamys 
Hypoestes pubescens 
Hypoestes pubiflora 
Hypoestes pulchra 
Hypoestes purpurea 
Hypoestes radicans 
Hypoestes richardii 
Hypoestes rodriguesiana 
Hypoestes rosea 
Hypoestes saboureaui 
Hypoestes salajeriana 
Hypoestes salensis 
Hypoestes saxicola 
Hypoestes scoparia 
Hypoestes serpens 
Hypoestes sessilifolia 
Hypoestes setigera 
Hypoestes sparsiflora 
Hypoestes spicata 
Hypoestes stachyoides 
Hypoestes stenoptera 
Hypoestes strobilifera 
Hypoestes subcapitata 
Hypoestes taeniata 
Hypoestes tenuifolia 
Hypoestes tenuis 
Hypoestes tetraptera 
Hypoestes teucrioides 
Hypoestes teysmanniana 
Hypoestes thomsoniana 
Hypoestes thothathrii 
Hypoestes transversa 
Hypoestes trichochlamys 
Hypoestes triflora 
Hypoestes tubiflora 
Hypoestes unilateralis 
Hypoestes urophora 
Hypoestes vagabunda 
Hypoestes vidalii 
Hypoestes viguieri 
Hypoestes warpurioides

References

External links

 H. phyllostachya USDA Profile
Hypoestes, Polka Dot Plant

 
Paleotropical flora
Acanthaceae genera
Taxa named by Daniel Solander
Taxa named by Robert Brown (botanist, born 1773)